The EBEC (European BEST Engineering Competition) Nordic is an engineering competition. It was first conceived at the regional meeting in Røros in autumn 2007. The Nordic engineering competition did not officially begin until the regional meeting in Copenhagen in spring 2009. Shortly after, a coordinator was selected, followed by the selection of a hosting BEST group. At the regional meeting in Uppsala in spring 2009, the Nordic engineering competition was established as nordBEC, standing for Nordic BEST Engineering Competition. The first nordBEC was held in Copenhagen, from 27–31 March 2010, and the second one in Trondheim, from 16–20 April 2011

Structure
NordBEC gathers the winners of local rounds of engineering competitions organized in top Scandinavian universities. As a result, the best students from the entire region will be selected. During the competition, students work in teams of 4, using their creativity, innovative thinking, and teamwork skills in order to come up with solutions for challenges set for them.

NordBEC has two categories:
Team Design: This category consists of solving a given technical problem within a limited amount of time. The outcome is a device that has to solve the problem.
Case Study: It is a task, where a theoretical issue is being considered, and a solution has to be presented. In the end the teams give a presentation of the solutions they came up with.

Local rounds
In the Nordic region there are 10 different BEST groups. In 2010, eight of these groups have decided to have a local engineering competition. The winning teams in each local engineering competition attend the nordBEC. The following universities actively participate:
 Aalborg University
 Technical University of Denmark
 Chalmers University of Technology
 Aalto University
 Lund University
 Royal Institute of Technology
 Tampere University of Technology
 Norwegian University of Science and Technology
 Uppsala University

2010 Edition
nordBEC (Nordic BEST Engineering Competition) was organised for the first time by Local BEST Group Copenhagen between the 27th and 31 March 2010. 60 students representing 8 Nordic Universities of Technology obtained passes for nordBEC by winning Local BEST Engineering Competitions (LBECs) at their home universities. The winners won a chance to participate the European BEST Engineering Competition, which took place in Cluj-Napoca, August 2010.

2011 Edition
The Second edition was organised by Local BEST Group Trondheim from the 16th till 20 April 2011.

External links
 nordBEC
 EBEC
 BEST (Board of European Students of Technology)

Engineering competitions
Engineering education
European student competitions
European student organizations
Student competitions